Amber Dotson (born in Garland, Texas) is an American country music artist. Initially a songwriter for Sony/Tree Publishing, Dotson soon began singing demos as well. She also made an appearance on Travis Tritt's 2004 album My Honky Tonk History as a background vocalist. George Strait heard some of the singer's demos, and asked her to join him on his 2005 tour, which also included Dierks Bentley. Dotson was signed to Capitol Records Nashville in 2005, and although she released two singles for the label, she did not release an album.

Discography

Singles

Music videos

References

External links
Amber Dotson official website

American women country singers
American country singer-songwriters
Singer-songwriters from Texas
People from Garland, Texas
Year of birth missing (living people)
Living people
Capitol Records artists
Country musicians from Texas
21st-century American women